The Inspiron 1525 is a laptop designed and distributed by Dell as part of their Inspiron product line. There is also an AMD variant known as the Inspiron 1526.  The laptop is the successor to the Inspiron 1520, and was released on January 4, 2008. This computer was available to purchase on the Dell website, where it could be customized to the user's specification.

On June 26, 2008, this laptop was followed with the release of the Inspiron 1535, otherwise known as the Dell Studio laptop. On January 6, 2009, the Inspiron 1525 was superseded by the Inspiron 1545, which gives mostly higher-end configuration options at a lower starting price, but lacks features such as the HDMI port, LED indicator lights and two headphone jacks. The laptop was discontinued on February 26, 2009, which left the Inspiron 1545 as Dell's 15-inch budget laptop.

Overview
After strong sales numbers, the Dell Inspiron 1520 received widespread praise regarding its size and small screen. The Inspiron 1525 was intended to address some of the issues with the Inspiron 1520. The 1525 weighed approximately six pounds – half a pound lighter than the 1520. This laptop can be considered as a mid-range Dell computer, between the smaller 1420 model and the more expensive XPS M1530 model. The 1525 featured a chassis with a new edge design, which appears on all of Dell's current laptops; a departure from the design of previous Inspiron laptops, which were perceived as bulky and boxy.

System specifications
Since the user is able to customize the unit, included hardware varies from laptop to laptop. However, there are several components which are generally fitted as standard in each unit:

 Processors: Intel Celeron 540, 550 or 560, Intel Pentium Dual-Core T2370, T2390, T2330, T4200, T4500 and the Intel Pentium/Intel Core 2 Duo T5250, T5450, T5550, T5750, T7250, T8100, T8300, T9300 or T9500.
 Memory: 512 MB, or 1, 2, 3, 4, 5, and 6 GB of shared dual channel DDR2 SDRAM @ 667 MHz
 Chipset: Intel GM965 Express Chipset
 Graphics: Integrated Intel GMA X3100 graphics
 Display: 15.4" widescreen with a 1280 × 800 resolution, 15.4" widescreen with a 1280 × 800 resolution and TrueLife, or a 15.4" widescreen with a 1440 × 900 high resolution and TrueLife
 Storage: 80, 120, 160, 250 or 320 GB SATA at 5400 RPM HDD
 Optical drive: 8× tray-load dual-layer DVD+/-RW drive, 2× tray-load Blu-ray disc combo drive or 2x Blu-ray disc burner
 Battery: 4-cell (28 Whr), 6-cell (56 Whr), or 9-cell (85 Whr) lithium-ion
 Wi-Fi: Broadcom 4312 based, Dell Wireless 1397 802.11g half mini-card (Previously changed to 1395 802.11b/g full mini-card), or 1490 802.11a/g/n full mini-card (Broadcom 4311 based), or Intel Next-Gen 4965AGN 802.11a/g/n Wi-Fi 
 I/O ports: 1× Fast Ethernet port, 1× 56 kbit/s modem, 1× S-Video output, 4× USB 2.0 ports, 1× Express Card slot, 1× VGA port, 1× HDMI output, 1× FireWire port (optional), 2x headphone jacks, 1x microphone port (optional), and 1× power adapter connector
Camera (optional): Integrated 2.0 MP camera

The most notable difference between this laptop and its predecessor, is that the 1520 model was fitted with a dedicated graphics card whereas the 1525 is not. It has been speculated that this is an attempt by Dell to appeal to a wider market of computer consumers. In a 2008 processor speed test, the Inspiron 1525 placed 14 out of the 18 tested computers. The touchpad has been upgraded from that of the 1520, with one which is designed to allow faster scrolling through web pages. Strangely this model contains a SIM card slot underneath the battery compartment. However reading data, or using Internet from SIM cards is not possible without a separate wireless modem-card.

Software
The Inspiron 1525 typically comes with a version of the Windows Vista, Windows 7 or Ubuntu 9.04 Operating System pre-installed. Both 32-bit and 64-bit can work. Ubuntu 12.04 and Linux Debian Wheezy are known to be working out-of-the-box on this model. If it comes with Windows Vista/7, it contains a copy of Office 2007.

Compatible System Software
Compatible OS(s):
Windows XP - Windows 10, Ubuntu 7.10 and newer
(Any 9x version of Windows will run with lack of driver support and 11 can be installed unofficially, it is not recommended with the laptop having low processing power)

BIOS:
Dell BIOS A13 - A17 

UEFI System:
No

Upgrade
The Inspiron 1525 can be upgraded to Windows 10 32-bit or 64-bit but has no compatibility with Windows 11 due to lack of TPM 2.0 support, however it can be unofficially installed, but the low processing power of the machine won't make it ideal to do so.

A fresh installation of Windows 10 64-bit already provides all required drivers for this laptop, including the webcam, SD card reader, WiFi adapter, DVD/CDRW Combo drive, Intel GM965 chipset, on-board Intel graphics and multimedia keys.  There are however onboard devices that require addition drivers :
 The default Microsoft touchpad driver works well, but lacks support of advanced touchpad features and customizations; A Dell touchpad driver can be forced-installed to get access to all touchpad settings (Alps_Touchpad_W8_X02_A01_Setup-W71Y8_ZPE).  
 A few of the keyboard Fn keys don't work (F1,F3 and F8) but full support can be added by installing the Dell QuickSet 64-bit software package (Dell_QuickSet_A07_R272666.exe).
 The driver for the Dell Wireless 1505 Draft 802.11n WLAN Mini-Card that comes with the Windows 10 64-bit installation is a Microsoft driver (v5.100.245.200, dated 212-03-14).  This drivers works but is not very stable and suffers from frequent disconnects. This wifi adapter uses a Broadcom BCM43xx chip. Broadcom released newer driver versions for that chip in 2016, such as the BCM43xx_7.35.317.3 driver released in 2016. This newer Broadcom driver can be force-installed and provides better stability than the 2012 Microsoft driver.
 The "Display Adapter" driver (for the 965 Express Chipset) that automatically comes with the Windows 10 64-bit installation (directly from Microsoft) is version 8.15.10.2697 (initially released for Windows 8.1 64-bit). This driver seems to have compatibility problems causing sporadic (but minor) graphics corruptions in the desktop UI elements, especially after coming out of sleep.  Reverting to the latest driver available from the Intel website, i.e. v8.15.10.1930 (initially released for Windows 7 64-bit) seems to reduce the occurrence.  But there's no proof yet the Video Driver is the source of this corruption problem. We would need more data to come with an official conclusion on this.

This computer has two DDR2 SODIMM slots and can be upgraded to 6GB of RAM, with a set of 2GB and 4GB modules. Both 667Mhz and 800Mhz modules are supported (PC2-5300 or PC2-6400).

Graphics cannot be upgraded due to being integration to the mainboard.

Processors can be upgraded to any Socket P Intel Core2 Duo mobile processor in the T8x00 series, and to certain T9x00 series processors whose FSB speed is limited to 800 MT/Sec.

Other software
Other software provided with the laptop includes:

 Dell MediaDirect media player
 Microsoft Works office suite
 Roxio Creator DVD/CD authoring software

On February 18, 2008, it was announced that Ubuntu 7.10 would be available as an optional operating system for the laptop this since was shipped with Ubuntu 9.04 until support ended.

Customization
The user is able to decide which components they wish to be included, during the ordering process, by selecting from a range of hardware on the website. These possible components include a range of processors, operating systems, graphics cards, a webcam and various other peripherals. In addition, Bluetooth and an integrated mobile broadband card can also be installed upon request, and the default battery can be replaced with an alternative.

Reception
The Inspiron 1525 has received a great deal of positive attention. General computer users welcomed the relatively low price, as well as the easily accessible volume control keys, and hardware reviewers have praised the customizability of the laptop, as well as its system specifications and light frame. In general, users have made positive reference to the screen, with some describing the display as "flawless", as well as the inclusion of a webcam and dual headphone jacks. Some reviewers claim that the battery life is a good point of the system.

Despite being a high-selling model, and receiving a large amount of positive feedback, the Inspiron 1525 has also attracted some level of criticism. Some critics feel that the sound quality is unfit for a recently produced laptop, claiming "raspy-sounding speakers take some of the shine off the 1525's entertainment appeal", whereas others have criticized the system's performance and battery life. The wireless switch is located on the right side of the bottom half, close to the front and is easily overlooked. Prominent placement near the volume and media controls would be much easier for users to find. The positioning of the cooling fans render the laptop incapable of supporting high-end graphics cards. 
Some users have encountered technical problems, many of which center around the webcam and built-in microphone. A common complaint is that the supplied fan is irritatingly loud, and many users have tried to rectify it on their own. The placement of the headphone jacks on the front of the unit leads to inconvenient trailing wires when external speakers are connected. A touchpad design flaw causes the button to stick, requiring the replacement of the entire palmrest assembly. Users have also reported numerous hard drive problems, many related to overheating.

Noteworthy hardware issues
The Inspiron 1525 utilizes a single heat sink to dissipate heat away from the CPU & GPU.  The Inspiron 1525 is not the only model that uses a single copper alloy conduit, it is one of the more common.  The Inspiron 1525, models affected will combine the Intel Core 2 or Intel Dual Core CPU's.

CPU/GPU degradation (over time) due, primarily to extended overheating.  While fan failure & vent blockages will exacerbate these issues, these issues, in addition to general component failures from extended periods of overheating beyond components tested safety margins. Generally causing product component failure, in some cases even fire hazard.  It is recommended that you read & understand the DELL INC., *technical article, should you experience these issues. Dell Support Article.

For both the 1525 and 1526, a low CMOS battery can prevent the computer from operating properly.
 Replacement when done the "right" way requires removal of the main board, as the CMOS is located on its underside. However, there is a method that involves shimming the case open and using an angled pick to remove and replace the battery, but this method can lead to casement damage if done without care.

See also
 Dell Inspiron laptops
 Dell Studio Laptop
 List of laptop brands and manufacturers

References

Inspiron 1525